Johan Svärdshammar (born in Stockholm – September 21, 1974) is composer, guitarist and backing vocalist in the bands Waves under Water and LinaLaukaR which he founded together with Angelica Segerbäck. In the past he has also played in other band formations such as Cynthia Leech.

In 2007 Johan wanted to form a new group with a female vocalist and asked Angelica if she would be interested in trying to sing to a few of his songs. They recorded two songs during one day and were both very happy with the result. Thus the band was formed.

Discography

Waves under Water

Albums
All of Your Light – (CD Album) 2011 – Danse Macabre
Serpents and the Tree – (CD Album) 2009 – Calorique Records, Danse Macabre
A Short Presentation of – (Demo) 2009
Winter Garden – (Demo) 2008

Singles
Tomorrow – (digital) 2011
Red Red Star – (digital) 2010
Winter Garden – (digital) 2009

Compilation appearances
Dark Alliance vol. 3 – (CD) 2009, Track #1 "Serpents and the Tree" – Danse Macabre
New Signs & Sounds 11/09 – (CD) 2009, Track #2 "Serpents and the Tree" – Zillo
Sonic Seducer Cold Hands Seduction Vol. 100 (CD) 2009, Track #7 "Winter Garden" – Sonic Seducer
Gothic Lifestyle 3 (CD) November 2009, Track #13 "Serpents and the Tree" – Gothic Magazine
EXTREME traumfänger 10 (CD) December 2009, Track #9 "Nothing More" – UpScene
Die Zillo-CD 05/2010 (CD) April 2010, Track #15 "Red Red Star" – Zillo
Dark Alliance vol. 7 – (CD) 2010, Track #8 "Red Red Star" – Danse Macabre

LinaLaukaR

Albums
LinaLaukaR – (Demo) 2009

See also
Waves under Water
LinaLaukaR
Angelica Segerbäck

External links
Waves under Water – Official MySpace.com profile
LinaLaukaR – Official MySpace.com profile

References

1974 births
Living people
21st-century Swedish singers
21st-century Swedish male singers